Doug Barthel is an American politician and former law enforcement officer serving as a member of the South Dakota House of Representatives from the 10th district.

Career 
Barthel served as the police chief in the Sioux Falls Police Department. He also worked as a public affairs specialist at Sanford Health.

Barthel was elected to the South Dakota House of Representatives in 2016 and assumed office in 2017. He was re-elected in 2018 & 2020. Barthel is a member of the House Judiciary Committee and House Local Government Committee.

References 

Living people
Republican Party members of the South Dakota House of Representatives
Year of birth missing (living people)
21st-century American politicians